Roderick Allen may refer to:

Roderick R. Allen (1894–1970), Major General of the U.S. Army
Rod Allen (born 1959), baseball analyst
Rod Allen (advertising executive) (1929–2007)

See also
Rodney Allen (disambiguation)
Allen (surname)